Seychellois cuisine is the cuisine of the Republic of Seychelles, an archipelago country consisting of 115 islands. Fish plays a prominent part in country's cuisine because of its location in the Indian Ocean. The Seychelles's cuisine has been influenced by African, British, French, Spanish, Indian and Chinese cuisines.

The use of spices such as ginger, lemongrass, coriander and tamarind are a significant component of Seychellois cuisine. Fresh fish and fruits are sold by street vendors in various places.

Common foods and dishes

Staple foods include fish, seafood and shellfish dishes, often accompanied with rice. Fish dishes are cooked in several ways, such as steamed, grilled, wrapped in banana leaves, baked, salted and smoked. Curry dishes with rice are also a significant aspect of the country's cuisine.

Additional food staples include shark, breadfruit, mangoes and fish.

 Chicken dishes, such as chicken curry and coconut milk
 Coconut curry
 Dhal (lentils)
 Fish curry
 Saffron rice
 Fresh tropical fruits
 Ladob is eaten either as a savory dish or as a dessert. The dessert version usually consists of ripe plantain and sweet potatoes (but may also include cassava, breadfruit or even corosol) boiled with coconut milk, sugar, nutmeg and vanilla in the form of a pod until the fruit is soft and the sauce is creamy. The savory dish usually includes salted fish, cooked in a similar fashion to the dessert version, with plantain, kasava and breadfruit, but with salt used in place of sugar (and omitting vanilla).
 Shark chutney typically consists of boiled skinned shark, finely mashed, and cooked with squeezed bilenbi juice and lime. It is mixed with onion and spices, and the onion is fried and it is cooked in oil.
 Vegetables

Delicacies and specialty dishes
 Bat curry (kari sousouri) is considered a delicacy in Seychelles.
 Bouyon bred—fish soup, made with greens
 Bourzwa griye—grilled red snapper kari bernik kasava pudding
 Satini Reken—shark chutney 
 Coconut curries
 Fruit bat has been described as a delicacy
 Kat-kat banane—green bananas and fish cooked in coconut milk
 Salad palmis—palm heart salad, prepared with coconut palm

Beverages
Coconut water and fresh juices are some of the beverages in Seychellois cuisine. Alcoholic drinks include the palm wine calou (or kalou), bakka'' rum and beers produced in the country such as Seybrew and Eku. Wine is obtainable at most Seychelles restaurants.

Food industry
The Indian Ocean Tuna company's processing plant is one of the largest tuna canneries in the world. It is located in Victoria, Seychelles.

See also

 African cuisine
 Index of Seychelles-related articles

References

 
Seychellois culture
Seychelles